Þrándarjökull is a small glacier in eastern Iceland.

Þrándarjökull
Þrándarjökull
Þrándarjökull